Birch Lake may refer to:

Communities
Birch Lake Township, in Cass County, Minnesota
Birch Lake, a hamlet in Meadstead Rural Municipality No. 497, Saskatchewan
Harding-Birch Lakes, a census-designated place in Alaska

Lakes

Canada
Birch Lake (Nova Scotia)
Birch Lake (Ontario), one of nineteen lakes of that name in Ontario

United States
Birch Lake (Aitkin County, Minnesota)
Birch Lake (Alaska), in Fairbanks North Star Borough
Birch Lake, in Goodhue County, Minnesota
Birch Lake (Cass County, Minnesota)
Birch Lake, in White Bear Lake, Minnesota
Birch Lake, in Vandalia, Michigan
Birch Lake (Oklahoma), in Osage County

Canada and United States
Birch Lake (Minnesota/Ontario), an international lake in St. Louis County, Minnesota

Parks
Birch Lakes State Forest, Minnesota
Birch Lake State Recreation Site, Alaska